Khilona ("Toy") may refer to:

 Khilona (1942 film), Indian film
 Khilona (1970 film), Indian film